The Association of Professional Piercers is the oldest and longest running organization for professional piercing.

History
The Association of Professional Piercers was founded in the 1994 by Michaela Grey and colleagues. The first members were professional piercers from Gauntlet and other early piercing studios. Established in 1994 as an international non-profit organization, California-based and dedicated to the dissemination of vital health and safety information about body piercing to piercers, health care professionals, legislators, and the general public. It is a nonprofit voluntary alliance dedicated to the dissemination of information about body piercing. Today there are APP Members all over the world. 

The organization works to disseminate information to both customers and piercers, and they work with legal assistance to countries where the piercing is a bit beside the law.  The organization also produces annual meetings that bring many of the best piercers in the world together to share knowledge.

Publishes The Point: Journal of Body Piercing, a quarterly newsletter dedicated to piercing related news and information for individuals in the industry.

APP Direction 
Governed by a voluntary elected Board of Directors, the APP is a united group of piercing professionals that freely shares information to help fellow members, piercers, health care professionals, legislators, health inspectors, and the general public get the best and most up-to-date information about body piercing.

Board of Directors 
 Luis Garcia  - President
 Becky Dill - Secretary
 Brian Skellie - Vice President
 Pablo Perelmuter - Medical liaison
 Cassi Lopez - PR/Outreach
 Cale Belford - Membership Liaison
 Christina Blossey - Legislation liaison 
 Paul King - Treasurer

APP Outreach 
 Provides a professional association for piercers
 Encourages piercers to meet and/or exceed the APP set standards and provides an avenue to show the public that this standard is being met.
 Provides piercers, legislators, and the public with support and assistance in drafting appropriate body art legislation and regulation in the industry.
 Provides piercing technique, business, and health education classes at our Annual Conference for piercers, health inspectors, and others related to the industry.
 Provides educational and informational materials, including consumer-oriented brochures and our Health and Safety Procedure Manual for piercers.
 Attends and is involved in health related conferences.
 Provides information and professional opinions to the media, when requested and in response to erroneous information and articles about body piercing.
 Presents lectures to students, health care professionals, and other related groups.
 Does not police the piercing industry or piercers. The APP will respond to and resolve complaints against its members, in addition to those falsely claiming membership.
 Does not license or certify piercers. Members do receive a certificate of membership which must be renewed every year. Attendees of APP classes receive a seminar certificate.
 Does not allow piercings performed at its annual conference, nor does it teach people how to pierce. The APP provides supplemental education to piercers and has a number of Corporate Sponsors who provide basic piercing education.
 Does not dictate the piercing technique(s) its Members use, what aftercare they suggest, or what specific piercings they may choose to perform.
 Specifically addresses the practice of body piercing.
 Does not have a position on tattooing, branding, scarification, dermal punching, scalpelling, implants, or other types of body art.
 Members are not precluded from also practicing these types of body modification where they are allowed by law.
 Staffs an email/phone response system for individuals with questions regarding piercing.
 Maintains a comprehensive website with information for piercers, piercees, educators, legislators, health care professionals, and anyone else with questions about body piercing.

Examples of APP standards

Standards for Tools and Techniques for Initial Piercings 

Despite claiming (above under APP Outreach) “Does not dictate the piercing technique(s) its Members use ...” Under their “A Piercee's Bill of Rights” they specifically NEVER allow the use of piercing guns: “4. To know that piercing guns are NEVER appropriate, and are often dangerous when used on anything — including earlobes.”

Minimum Standards for Jewelry for Initial Piercings 
From Body piercing materials: Products with an ISO or ASTM designation are so noted and a statement specifying the finish requirements particular to body jewelry has been added. In addition, several materials designated for applications other than implants have been proven through historical and practical application to be suitably biocompatible for initial piercing.

References

External links
Official website: safepiercing.org
APP helps with tongue drive wheelchair system
APP helps with local piercing regulations president Elayne Angel quoted
APP helps with piercing regulations in FL
APP helps with national Body Art regulations
APP helps with national Body Art regulations
APP members talk about Body Art

Body modification
Online magazines published in the United States